Le Pondy is a commune in the Cher department in the Centre-Val de Loire region of France.

Geography

Population

Sights
 The fifteenth-century chateau.
 An eighteenth-century stone cross.

See also
Communes of the Cher department

References

Communes of Cher (department)